Bhavanisagar is a panchayat town in Erode district  in the state of Tamil Nadu, India. It is the main town in Bhavanisagar block.

Demographics
 India census, Bhavanisagar had a population of about 4,000. Males constitute 51% of the population and females 49%. Bhavanisagar has an average literacy rate of 64%, higher than the national average of 59.5%; with male literacy of 73% and female literacy of 54%. 9% of the population is under 6 years of age.

Politics
Bhavanisagar(SC) assembly constituency is part of Nilgiris (Lok Sabha constituency) since 2008.

Government Training Institutes
Civil Service Training Institute: This Institute is intended for the newly appointed
Govt.Servants in State Ministerial Service for all Departments in the state. A sprawling nearly 20 acre campus is allotted for this from the year 1974. So also a statewide Training Institute is run by the Rural Development Department to impart seasonal training to Rural Development Department Employees.

References

External links
 Erode district map showing the location of Bhavanisagar

Cities and towns in Erode district
Refugee camps in India